Tax Journal is a weekly magazine relating to business taxation in the United Kingdom published by LexisNexis. The magazine has been published since 1989, originally as The Tax Journal.

References

Business magazines published in the United Kingdom
Magazines established in 1989
Professional and trade magazines
Taxation in the United Kingdom
Weekly magazines published in the United Kingdom
Mass media in Surrey